Peč is a municipality and village in Jindřichův Hradec District in the South Bohemian Region of the Czech Republic. It has about 500 inhabitants.

Administrative parts
Villages of Lidéřovice and Urbaneč are administrative parts of Peč.

History
The first written mention of Peč is from 1305.

References

Villages in Jindřichův Hradec District